James Avery (born June 10, 1984 in Maple Creek, Saskatchewan, Canada) is a Minor League Baseball player who is a free agent. He was also a competitor for Canada in baseball at the 2008 Summer Olympics in Beijing.

Amateur career
A native of Maple Creek, Saskatchewan, Canada, Avery played college baseball at Niagara University. In 2003 and 2004, he played collegiate summer baseball with the Chatham A's of the Cape Cod Baseball League.

Professional career

Cincinnati Reds
Avery went 1–2 over 11 appearances, seven starts, split between the Rookie-League Gulf Coast Reds and Class-A Dayton Dragons of the Midwest League in 2005.

He spent majority of the 2006 season with Class-A Advanced Sarasota Reds, where he went 8–8 with a 4.43 ERA over 26 starts. He compiled a 2.22 ERA over five starts in the month of August. Avery lasted a season-high  innings against Fort Myers Miracle on September 3, allowing one run on seven hits en route to eighth and final win of the season. He made his first and only Triple-A appearance on August 24, allowing four runs over four innings of work as a member of the Louisville Bats.

Avery went 11–10 with a 5.22 ERA in 27 starts for the Double-A Chattanooga Lookouts in 2007. He was named Southern League Pitcher of the Week for May 7 to 13, going 2–0 with 13 innings pitched, three earned runs a 2.08 ERA with seven strikeouts.

With the Lookouts in 2008 he struck out season-high seven and allowed one earned run over six innings for his best outing of the year on May 3. He started all 24 games he appeared in and finished 7–8.

References

External links

1984 births
Living people
Algodoneros de Guasave players
Baseball people from Saskatchewan
Baseball players at the 2008 Summer Olympics
Canadian expatriate baseball players in Mexico
Canadian expatriate baseball players in the United States
Carolina Mudcats players
Chatham Anglers players
Chattanooga Lookouts players
Dayton Dragons players
Erie SeaWolves players
Gulf Coast Reds players
Leones de Yucatán players
Louisville Bats players
Lynchburg Hillcats players
Mexican League baseball pitchers
Olympic baseball players of Canada
Peoria Saguaros players
Rieleros de Aguascalientes players
Sarasota Reds players